The Bristol & District Cricket Association (BDCA or B&D) is an English cricket association that organises league and cup competitions in the Bristol area. The association covers Bristol, as well as parts of South Gloucestershire and North Somerset.

The league competition serves as a feeder league to the West of England Premier League (WEPL) as part of the pyramid structure of club cricket, with the winners of the B&D Senior Division gaining promotion to the Bristol & North Somerset Division of the WEPL.

Winners

References

External links
 Bristol and District Cricket Association website

English domestic cricket competitions
Cricket in Bristol